Anolis nemonteae is a species of anole lizard first found in Ecuador.

References

External links
Reptile Database

Anoles
Reptiles of Ecuador
Reptiles described in 2021